Ericka Hunter Yang is a Canadian-born singer, songwriter, dancer and actress. Hunter began her career as a Radio City Music Hall Rockette and made her Broadway debut in 2002. She has since been part of the original Broadway ensemble casts of Rock of Ages (later starring as Sherrie), American Psycho, Doctor Zhivago, the 2017 revival of Miss Saigon, and Moulin Rouge!

Early life 
Hunter was born in Ottawa, Ontario, to a Canadian mother and Chinese-born Hong Konger father. She grew up in the city's suburb of Nepean and attended a public performing arts high school. She has an older sister, Vanessa, and younger brother, Warren Yang, a former gymnast and actor. Hunter is of Chinese, Dutch, German, and English descent.

Career 
After studying dance and theater in her hometown of Ottawa, Ontario, she made her professional debut with Radio City Rockettes at 18. Ericka then joined the Toronto company of the Lion King before being cast as a featured dancer in the ABC/Disney movie The Music Man. In 2002, at the age of 20, she made her Broadway debut in the original revival cast of Flower Drum Song and then went on to perform in the Broadway cast of 42nd Street.

In 2006, she relocated to Los Angeles to develop a music and fashion career. She worked as an assistant to stylist Joe Zee performed alongside artists such as Rihanna, Shakira, and Justin Timberlake. During this period, she began using the professional name Ericka Hunter, taking the last name from a maternal great grandmother.

In 2008, she returned to New York. She joined the cast of the Broadway musical Rock of Ages in 2009. She later performed in Doctor Zhivago, the musical thriller American Psycho, Rock Of Ages (where she played the lead role of Sherrie), as well as the revival of Miss Saigon (understudied/performed the roles of Gigi and Ellen).

Early in 2018, she performed in the Danny Strong newly scripted version of Chess at the Kennedy Center. In addition to her Broadway credits, she's been cast in multiple TV productions including Mozart In The Jungle (Amazon), Smash (NBC), Modern Love (Amazon), and Katy Keene (CW).

In 2021, she was a Core Dancer on Schmigadoon!, released on Apple TV+.

Hunter is featured on French DJ Morgan Nagoya's dance single "Promised Land along with Jonny Rose and Chris Reeder. She released her first U.S. solo single "Fight to Believe" on January 17, 2013.

Theatre

Filmography

References

External links 
 Website
 , also  and 
 

Canadian women songwriters
Living people
Canadian musical theatre actresses
Canadian women pop singers
Actresses from Ottawa
Canadian female dancers
21st-century Canadian actresses
21st-century Canadian women singers
1982 births